Ed Boell (March 6, 1917 - March 14, 1998) was an American football player, coach, and official.

Boell played college football and baseball for the NYU Violets. He compiled a 17–7 record as a pitcher for the NYU baseball team and was quarterback of the football team. He was considered a triple-threat man in football, but later recalled: "I could throw the ball, and I could kick it. The only trouble with me was I had no speed."  He was recognized as one of the best college football players in the country in 1939 and played in the 1940 East-West Shrine Game and Chicago College All-Star Game.

He was selected by the Washington Redskins in the first round (eighth overall pick) of the 1940 NFL Draft. He rejected the Redskins' offer to play professional football for $200 a game and instead pursued a career as a coach and athletic director at Riverside High School on Long Island. He moved to Florida in 1946, taught and coached at Palm Beach High School, and became a basketball and baseball official. He was inducted into both the NYU Hall of Fame in 1976 and the Palm Beach County Sports Hall of Fame in 1980. He died in 1998 at age 81, after battling emphysema and cirrhosis of the liver.

References

1917 births
1998 deaths
American football quarterbacks
NYU Violets football players
Players of American football from New York (state)